Yablanitsa Municipality is a small municipality (obshtina) in Lovech Province, Central-North Bulgaria, located in the area of the so-called Fore-Balkan, north of Stara Planina mountain. It is named after its administrative centre - the town of Yablanitsa.

As of 2010, the west operating part of Hemus motorway ends near the main town. The motorway is planned to connect the capital city of Sofia with the port of Varna on the Bulgarian Black Sea Coast.

Settlements 

Yablanitsa Municipality includes the following 9 places (towns are shown in bold):

Demography 
The following table shows the change of the population during the last four decades.

Vital statistics 
The municipality of Yablanitsa has one of the highest birth rate in Bulgaria. Especially Roma people in some villages tend to have high fertility rates.

Religion 
According to the latest Bulgarian census of 2011, the religious composition, among those who answered the optional question on religious identification, was the following:

See also
Provinces of Bulgaria
Municipalities of Bulgaria
List of cities and towns in Bulgaria

References

External links
 Official website 

Municipalities in Lovech Province